Steinemann is a German surname. Notable people with the surname include:

Anne C. Steinemann (born 1961), American civil and environmental engineering academic
Eduard Steinemann (1906–1937), Swiss gymnast who competed in the 1928 and 1936 Summer Olympics
Eliane Steinemann, Swiss figure skater who competed in pair skating
Urs Steinemann (born 1959), Swiss rower

See also
Steinemann Island, an island off the northeast coast of Adelaide Island, southwest of Mount Velain, Antarctica
Steinman
Steinmann

German-language surnames